Míriam Nogueras i Camero (born 11 May 1980) is a Spanish business woman, politician from Catalonia who serves as Member of the Congress of Deputies of Spain.

Early life
Nogueras was born on 11 May 1980 in Dosrius, Catalonia. She is currently studying for a post graduate degree in digital marketing and electronic commerce.

Career

Nogueras is a co-owner of a textile company specialising in spinning. She is an executive committee member of the Catalan Business Circle (Cercle Català de Negocis) and a board member of ASECIEMA (textile business association) and MODACC (textile fashion cluster).

Nogueras contested the 2015 local elections as a Convergence and Union (CiU) electoral alliance candidate in Cardedeu and was elected. She contested the 2015 general election as a Democracy and Freedom (DiL) electoral alliance candidate in the Province of Barcelona and was elected to the Congress of Deputies. She was re-elected at the 2016 and 2019 general elections. In July 2018 she was elected vice-president of the Catalan European Democratic Party (PDeCAT).

In May 2018 Nogueras won the nomination to be the Together for Catalonia (JuntsxCat)'s mayoral candidate in Mataró at the 2019 local elections. However, at the 2019 local elections Nogueras was placed 27th on the JxCat's list of candidates in Mataró but the alliance only managed to win two seats in the municipality and as a result she failed to get elected. In July 2020 she left the executive of the PDeCAT.

Nogueras is part of the "No vull pagar" anti-toll campaign.

Positions 
Close to the positions of Carles Puigdemont and Quim Torra and a staunch supporter of Catalan independence, she considers Spain to be a "rotten manure heap".

Electoral history

Personal life
Nogueras has two children.

References

1980 births
Catalan European Democratic Party politicians
Businesspeople from Catalonia
Women politicians from Catalonia
Convergence and Union politicians
Democratic Convergence of Catalonia politicians
Independent politicians in Catalonia
Living people
Members of the 11th Congress of Deputies (Spain)
Members of the 12th Congress of Deputies (Spain)
Members of the 13th Congress of Deputies (Spain)
Members of the 14th Congress of Deputies (Spain)
Municipal councillors in the province of Barcelona
People from Vallès Oriental
Together for Catalonia (2017) politicians
Women members of the Congress of Deputies (Spain)